Sophie Franziska Maria Germaine Habsburg also known as Archduchess Sophie of Austria (born on 19 January 1959) is a French-born Italian designer, German aristocrat and former model.

Career
Sophie Habsburg was born in Paris on 19 January 1959, the daughter of Archduke Ferdinand Karl Max of Austria and Countess Helene of Törring-Jettenbach. She descends from the House of Habsburg-Lorraine, which reigned over Austria-Hungary until its deposition in 1918. While studying interior design in her hometown, she worked as a model.

At the age of 20, Habsburg moved to Madrid and had a successful career in modelling. She appeared in De Beers and Valentino commercials, as well as on the cover of the first issue of Vogue Spain. At the same time she also designed jewellery and worked as decorator, radio host and journalist, interviewing royals and actors. She became friends with Richard Gere after an interview and raised funds with him for the charity SOS Children's Villages.

In 2010, Habsburg started designing handbags. Her bags are often worn by members of the Spanish and British royal families.

Personal life
On 11 February 1990 in Salzburg, Sophie Habsburg married the Prince Mariano Hugo of Windisch-Graetz, member of the House of Windisch-Graetz. They had three children, one of whom, Prince Alexis Ferdinand, died in a car accident in 2010.

References

References
 ¡HOLA! USA: celebrities news, fashion and beauty - us.hola.com 
 Exclusiva en ¡HOLA!: Sofía de Habsburgo, princesa de Windisch-Graetz, nos recibe en su casa-palacio de Caserta, cerca de Nápoles, donde tiene las raíces familiares 
 ABC (Madrid) - 24/07/1985, p. 84 - ABC.es Hemeroteca

House of Habsburg-Lorraine
1959 births
Living people
People from Boulogne-Billancourt
Windisch-Graetz
Austrian princesses
Italian fashion designers
Italian women fashion designers
French fashion designers
French women fashion designers
Italian people of Austrian descent
French people of Austrian descent